Dude is a 2018 American coming-of-age comedy-drama film directed by Olivia Milch and written by Milch and Kendall McKinnon. The film stars Lucy Hale, Kathryn Prescott, Alexandra Shipp, Awkwafina, Austin Butler and Michaela Watkins.

It was released on April 20, 2018, by Netflix.

Plot
Lily, Chloe, Amelia, and Rebecca are at junior prom. Chloe's brother Thomas takes Lily onto the field and she tells him she cannot imagine leaving. They almost kiss when Rebecca and the others tell them the limo arrived.

Lily takes Rebecca and Amelia home, taking Chloe to meet Thomas in the mountains. The three separate and Thomas is killed in a car crash on the way home. At the funeral, Chloe hugs her mom, crying as Lily remains silent.

One year later the girls arrive at school stoned. Lily talks with Noah about prom, then she and Chloe walk down the halls recalling how many times they've done so.

Lily then arranges parties at various houses. When the girls get back to the car they see their "Donkey Bong". Amelia tells Rebecca her parents are divorcing, saying they only see her as an extension of their ego. Lily and Chloe see their pot dealer friend Biff who reminds them of Thomas's favourite strain “cough”.

Lily argues with the principal about her strengths and weaknesses. Chloe walks onto the field remembering the previous year, playing Thomas's last voice message. Sam consoles her, asking her to prom. Noah serenades Lily as a promposal but fails. As she and Chloe talk, Rebecca barges in, telling them someone caught her masturbating over the school librarian, Bemis.

The girls then go to a house party. Noah arrives, apologising to Lily by offering her a joint and then makes out with her. The cops arrive to break up the party.

Lily and Sam sell prom tickets the next day when Lily finds out that Liv was traumatised by James, who got her in trouble by writing a dirty joke on an essay. After she scolds him, Noah texts her to come over to fool around. The next day his ex threatens Lily.

The girls go to another party, Chloe tells Lily she got into NYU but wants to go to UCSB. Lily freaks out, going to a room with a boy from another school, Mike, and is raped. Chloe, Rebecca and Amelia all ditch her, so she calls a taxi and cries all the way home.

The next morning everyone goes to her house and she flips out at Amelia and Rebecca for not telling her about Chloe's acceptance letter. They all start badmouthing Lily, so she walks away. Chloe stops her, saying she is being selfish for wanting her to not be friends with people who did not know Thomas.

Angry Lily drives down the street with a flashback of Thomas, stopping when she sees Rebecca at a coffee shop with her potential roommate and mocking them until a police officer comes up. Meaning to ask her why she is illegally parked, he then notices Donkey Bong in the back. Lily panics until the officer tells her that he won't ruin her life forever but will mess it up for at least a week.

Lily is forced by her mum to smash the bong. The girls all dodge her calls, leaving her alone. Noah tries to talk to Lily but she remains stubborn, forcing him to walk away.
13
James helps Lily see she has been selfish. At prom alone, she eventually goes to the bathroom to cry. Rebecca talks to Bemis while Lily has a flashback of her and Thomas on the field declaring their love.

Lily apologises to Chloe for being intense about Thomas, saying the pain will never go away but that she cannot mourn what she could’ve been. They make up and go inside, where Lily apologises to Amelia and Rebecca. There, Chloe kicks Mike in the balls and Noah's girlfriend breaks up with him. Sam takes a picture of the girls who then bury the remains of Donkey Bong with Jon Bong Jovi, Sean Bongery and Bong Connery.

Lily practices her graduation speech in front of her friends, then the entire school. At their family graduation party, Bemis arrives, introducing himself as “Immanuel”. Noah congratulates Lily on her speech and they kiss, and she gets a photo taken with her brother and sister. Amelia then notices their marijuana brownies were given to their parents. Looking off into the sky and distant Los Angeles, the story ends.

Cast 

 Lucy Hale as Lily
 Kathryn Prescott as Chloe Daniels
 Alexandra Shipp as Amelia
 Awkwafina as Rebecca
 Alex Wolff as Noah
 Brooke Smith as Lorraine Daniels
 Jerry MacKinnon as Sam
 Ronen Rubinstein as Mike
 Satya Bhabha as Immanuel Bemis
 Sydney Lucas as Olivia
 Nora Dunn as Rosa
 Ian Gomez as Jerry
 Colton Dunn as Officer Higgins
 Austin Abrams as James
 Austin Butler as Thomas Daniels
 Michaela Watkins as Jill
 Jack McBrayer as Guy
 Sasha Spielberg as Carrie
 Claudia Doumit as Jessica
 Artemis Pebdani as Sapphire
 Esther Povitsky as Alicia
 Stony Blyden as Stony

Production 
On November 2, 2015, it was announced that Olivia Milch would make her directorial debut with the comedy film, titled Dude, based on her own script about four best high school girlfriends, with Lucy Hale starring. The script was listed in the 2013 Black List of best unproduced scripts. Heather Rae, Langley Perer, Jimmy Miller, Andrew Duncan, and Jen Isaacson produced the film. The same month, Kathryn Prescott, Alexandra Shipp, Awkwafina, Alex Wolff, Satya Bhabha, Ronen Rubinstein and Austin Butler joined the cast of the film. In December 2015, Austin Abrams and Jerry McKinnon were also added.

Filming
Principal photography on the film began on November 30, 2015 in Los Angeles.

Release
In May 2017, Netflix acquired distribution rights to the film. They released the film on their service on April 20, 2018.

References

External links 
 
 
 
 

2018 films
2018 comedy-drama films
2018 directorial debut films
2018 independent films
2010s buddy comedy-drama films
2010s coming-of-age comedy-drama films
2010s female buddy films
2010s high school films
2010s teen comedy-drama films
American buddy comedy-drama films
American coming-of-age comedy-drama films
American female buddy films
American films about cannabis
American high school films
American independent films
American teen comedy-drama films
Films about proms
Films set in Los Angeles
Films shot in Los Angeles
English-language Netflix original films
Stoner films
2010s English-language films
2010s American films